Erica urna-viridis, the sticky heath or bottle-green heath, is a species of Erica that was naturally restricted to the city of Cape Town, South Africa, in particular the Peninsula Sandstone Fynbos of Table Mountain.

It bears sticky green flowers - the origin of its common names - and grows to a height of about 1 meter.

References

urna-viridis
Endemic flora of South Africa
Flora of the Cape Provinces
Natural history of Cape Town
Species endangered by urbanization